Douglas Ferreira, or simply Douglão (born May 18, 1986), is a Brazilian footballer.

Club career
Born in Santos, coast of São Paulo, Douglão appeared for Coritiba and Internacional. In the 2008 summer he moved to French side Nantes, after agreeing to a three-year deal with the Ligue 1 side.

On 17 August 2009 Douglão moved teams and countries again, signing a three-year deal with Superleague Greece side Kavala, appearing regularly for the club. In August 2011 he joined Braga, but acted mainly as a backup during his two-year spell at the Minho side.

On 3 August 2013 Douglão joined Qatar SC in a season-loan deal. He rescinded his link with Braga in July of the following year, moving to Akhisar Belediyespor shortly after.

Career statistics

Club

Honours
SC Braga
Portuguese League Cup: 2012–13

References

1986 births
Footballers from São Paulo (state)
Brazilian footballers
Brazilian expatriate footballers
Living people
Sport Club Internacional players
Coritiba Foot Ball Club players
Ligue 1 players
Super League Greece players
Primeira Liga players
FC Nantes players
S.C. Braga players
Qatar SC players
Akhisarspor footballers
Expatriate footballers in France
Expatriate footballers in Greece
Expatriate footballers in Portugal
Expatriate footballers in Qatar
Expatriate footballers in Turkey
Brazilian expatriate sportspeople in France
Brazilian expatriate sportspeople in Greece
Brazilian expatriate sportspeople in Portugal
Brazilian expatriate sportspeople in Qatar
Brazilian expatriate sportspeople in Turkey
Qatar Stars League players
Association football defenders